Huiberdina is a first name, one of the more common female Dutch counterparts of the male name Hubrecht. It is related to Bertha and may refer to
Huiberdina Donkervoort (born 1953), Dutch Olympic rower
Huiberdina Krul (1922–1994), Dutch Olympic gymnast